Salina Saibi (born 10 January 1982) is a Malaysian actress and model. Known for her role in police procedural television series, CID 3278 and Gerak Khas, Saibi made a breakthrough role as Amy in her debut film, Bohsia: Jangan Pilih Jalan Hitam (2009) directed by Syamsul Yusof, wherein she won the Best Supporting Actress at the 22nd Malaysia Film Festival.

Early life
Saibi was born on 10 January 1982 in Kuala Lumpur and is the second child of five siblings. She graduated with Sijil Pelajaran Malaysia (SPM).

Career
Prior to her acting career, Saibi first began her early career as a singer, although it is unclear whether she ever recorded an album or vice versa. During her early years in showbiz, Saibi has appeared in numerous drama series and telemovies on major TV networks including RTM, TV3, TV9 and Astro.

She rose to fame when portraying Inspector Rita in the police procedural drama series CID 3278 which also stars Faizal Yusof, Along Eyzendy, Azman Nor, criminal analyst Kamal Affandi Hashim and many others.

In 2007, Saibi was first appeared as a guest star in Gerak Khas where she appeared in one of the series' episode in ninth season, "Misteri Elisa" ("The Mystery of Elisa"). From tenth season onwards, she became the regular cast as Inspector (later ASP) Salina. Since then, she has worked extensively with Yusof Haslam-owned Skop Productions, until Gerak Khas went on its final season in 2020. The series was originally set as a year-long series, but due to its continuous success and consistent top rating, the series was extended for an indefinite time until it finally ended on March 27, 2021, with a total of 20 seasons and 1,054 episodes. Saibi appeared in seasons 10 to 20 during this period.

Saibi appeared as a main role in Nabila Huda in the 2009 social action drama film, Bohsia: Jangan Pilih Jalan Hitam directed by Syamsul Yusof; where she portrays Amy, a bohsia girl who enjoyed a free lifestyle, it also stars Shaheizy Sam, Johan from Raja Lawak fame, Aaron Aziz and Diana Danielle. Her performance in the film enable Saibi to win the Best Supporting Actress at the 22nd Malaysia Film Festival. This is the only award that she received throughout her acting career.

Salina appeared in two films released simultaneously in 2011, the horror film Khurafat: Perjanjian Syaitan in which her character as Zura, Anna's close friend starring Sabrina Ali, and the romantic comedy Aku Bukan Tomboy, Salina plays her role as Sam, a lesbian girl who has feelings for Farisha starred by Scha Al-Yahya. The film requires her to wear a corsette.

She starred in the telemovie for Astro Citra, Asmara Beijing directed by Yusof Haslam, alongside Syamsul Yusof and Norman Hakim, tells the story of Dira who took herself away to Beijing, China after sulking with her love for Rizal. The rest of the telemovie was filmed in Kuala Lumpur. She then return as Amy in the film Jalan Kembali: Bohsia 2, sequel of the first film which premiered on 7 June 2012.

From 2014 to 2021, Saibi seems to shy away from public view and media spotlight and declines to appear in any television dramas to focus solely on Gerak Khas. In an interview with Sinar Harian, Saibi said that being part of the Gerak Khas production team makes her feel more comfortable and refused to receive any offers as she didn't want to be selfish while has no intentions to changed that. Saibi later revealed in an interview with Harian Metro in December 2020 that she wish to begin with Gerak Khas and ends with the series as well.

Saibi was one of the cast members of Syafiq Yusof's horror flick Penunggang Agama where she portrayed her role as Huda. After Gerak Khas ended, she appeared in TV3's primetime drama Perisik Cinta Tak Diundang, playing the role as Hanim. It become her first TV drama with other production companies in 8 years since Duri Di Hati (2013).

Personal life
Saibi married Azmir Osman (who is 19 years her senior) in August 2007. The couple have 2 daughters.

On 9 July 2017, her father, Saibi Kuntom died of liver cancer. Salina is also active in making and selling biscuits, especially during the fasting month of Ramadan.

Filmography

Film

Television series

Telemovie

Television

Advertisement

Awards and nominations

References

External links
 

1982 births
Living people
Malaysian actresses
21st-century Malaysian actresses
Malaysian television actresses
Malaysian film actresses
Malaysian female models
People from Kuala Lumpur
Malaysian Muslims
Malaysian people of Malay descent